John Low may refer to:
John Low (bishop) (died 1467), bishop of St Asaph, and of Rochester
Sir John Low (East India Company officer) (1788–1880), British East India Company general and administrator
John Low, name used by the defendant in United States v. Jackalow (1862)
John Low (footballer) (1874–?), Scottish footballer
Sir John Low (charity executive) (born 1953), British charity executive
John Low (sailor) in 2011 Dragon World Championships

See also
John Lowe (disambiguation)